Lechenaultia filiformis  is a species of flowering plant in the family Goodeniaceae and is native to northern Australia and New Guinea. It is a grasslike, ascending herb with scattered, narrow, fleshy leaves and pale purple-blue to creamy-white, tube-shaped flowers.

Description

Taxonomy
Lechenaultia filiformis was first formally described in 1810 by Robert Brown in his Prodromus Florae Novae Hollandiae et Insulae Van Diemen. The specific epithet (filiformis) means "thread-like".

Distribution and habitat
This lechenaultia grows in spinifex grassland or in woodland from the Kimberley region of northern Western Australia through the north of the Northern Territory to the Cape York Peninsula in Queensland and the coast of New Guinea.

References

filiformis
Eudicots of Western Australia
Flora of the Northern Territory
Flora of Queensland
Flora of New Guinea
Plants described in 1810
Taxa named by Robert Brown (botanist, born 1773)